Ossonoba may refer to :

 Ossonoba, a Roman city at the site of modern Faro, Portugal
 the former Diocese of Ossonoba, with see in that city, precursor of the Algarve bishopric of first Silves, (now) Faro
 Ossonoba (moth), a genus of moths